Saint Rupert or Robert may refer to:
Rupert of Salzburg (d. 710), bishop
Rupert of Bingen (d. 732), pilgrim
Robert de Turlande (c. 1001–1067), abbot
Robert of Molesme (d. 1111), founder of the Cistercian Order
Robert of Newminster (d. 1159), abbot
Robert of Knaresborough (c. 1160–1218), hermit
Robert Lawrence (martyr) (d. 1535), Carthusian
Robert Southwell (priest) (c. 1560-1595), poet and martyr
Robert Bellarmine (1542-1621), Jesuit, cardinal, Doctor of the Church

Saint-Robert as a toponym:
Saint-Robert, Quebec
Saint-Robert, Corrèze
Saint-Robert, Lot-et-Garonne
Saint-Égrève-Saint-Robert station, a train station in Saint-Égrève, Isère, France
Javerlhac-et-la-Chapelle-Saint-Robert
St. Robert, Missouri

See also
Blessed Robert (disambiguation)
Robert
Rupert (disambiguation)